Cyperus ohwii is a species of sedge that occurs across parts of Asia and Australia.

The species was first formally described by the botanist Georg Kükenthal in 1931.

See also
 List of Cyperus species

References

ohwii
Plants described in 1931
Taxa named by Georg Kükenthal
Flora of Queensland